Red Serpent is a 2003 Russian-German crime thriller directed by Gino Tanasescu.

Plot
Steve Nichols comes to Moscow to conclude a contract. Unbeknownst to Steve, he has to become a front for transporting drugs supplied by a local gangster nicknamed Red Serpent. And his personal consent is just a technical matter.

The only hope for the trapped businessman is the former KGB officer Sergei Popov, who has old scores with the Serpent.

Cast
Michael Pare as Steve Nichols 
Roy Scheider as Hassan (Red Serpent)
Oleg Taktarov as Sergey Popov
 Alexander Nevsky as Peter
 John Mastando as Dylan Navarre 
 Irina Apeksimova as Sasha
 Yuriy Dumchev as Shifty
 Gary Kasper as Ivan Kutuza
 Andris Lielais as Medvedev
 Vladimir Zaitsev as Gurov
 Egor Pazenko as Boris

Critical response
Russian film critic Valery Kichin considered the film unspectacular and boring, giving it a rating of 1 out of 10.

BadComedian called the Tanasescu film "stupidity, idiocy and nonsense".

Reviewer Andrey Volkov (Postcriticism.ru) named only the performance of some actors as a plus, but in general he described the film as far from professional cinema.

References

External links
 
2000s Russian-language films
2000s German films
2000s English-language films
Films set in Moscow
Films set in Russia
Films shot in Moscow
Russian crime action films
German crime action films
Films about the Russian Mafia
2003 multilingual films
Russian multilingual films
German multilingual films
2003 action films